Housata is a Czech drama film directed by Karel Smyczek. It was released in 1980.

Cast
 Yvetta Kornová - Marie
 Jaromíra Mílová - Sarka
 Veronika Gajerová
 Svatava Rádková
 Irena Visnarová
 Bozena Blahosová
 Dagmar Veselá
 Miroslava Vydrová
 Eva Vrbová
 Lenka Dandová
 Veronika Jeníková
 Jaromír Dulava
 Jirí Pistek
 Jana Vanková - Markova
 Marika Dolezalová

External links
 

1980 films
Czechoslovak drama films
Czech drama films
1980s Czech-language films
Films directed by Karel Smyczek
1980s Czech films